Mukthi Natheshwara Temple located in Binnamangala, Nelamangala, Karnataka, India, is dedicated to the deity Mukthi Natheshwara (the Hindu god Shiva). It dates back to the Rajaraja Chola period. (1110 A.D)

References

Chola architecture
Hindu temples in Bangalore